Conaty, is the anglicised form of the Gaelic Irish surname "Ó Connachtaigh", meaning "descendant of the Connachtman". The surname is predominantly found in County Cavan, Ireland, and, although uncommon, can be found in other parts of the country as well as in Irish communities in England and America.

Its coat of arms depict two golden boar and two golden axes upon a blue shield.

Variations in the spelling of Conaty include: O'Conaty, Connaghty, Connoty and MacConaghy.

Notable people with the surname 
Ua/Ó Connachtaigh

Searrach Ó Connachtaigh, killed in the Battle of Dún Dubáin (c.1145).
Tuathal Ó Connachtaigh, Bishop of Bréifni from 1152 to 1179
Flann Ua Connachtaigh, Bishop of Bréifni from c.1211 to 1231.

Conaty

Nicholas Conaty (1820–1886), Bishop of Kilmore from 1865 to 1886
Bill Conaty (born 1973), former professional American football player
Jack Conaty (born 1946), currently the chief political correspondent for WFLD-TV in Chicago
Nicholas Conaty (1820–1886), Irish Roman Catholic bishop for the Diocese of Kilmore
Thomas James Conaty (1847–1915), the Bishop of the Diocese of Monterey-Los Angeles from 1903 to 1915
Rich Conaty (1954–2016), New York City disc jockey
Roisin Conaty, London-Irish comedian
William J. Conaty, American businessman

See also
Bishop Conaty-Our Lady of Loretto High School, Catholic, archdiocesan, all-female high school in Los Angeles, California
Conaty Park, baseball venue in Smithfield, Rhode Island, United States